Stop! Stop! Stop! is the first English-language and fourth overall studio album by Ukrainian pop group Nu Virgos, released in 2004 by Sony Music Japan.

Track listing 

Stop! Stop! Stop!
Till The Morning Light
Hold Me Closer
Good Morning, Daddy!
Let Me Introduce My Mama
Kill My Girlfriend
Don't Ever Leave Me Love
Where I'm Gonna Find My Love
Thank You For The Summer
Every Day
Stop! Stop! Stop! (Upbeat Version)
Ai No Wana (Kill My Girlfriend)
Stop! Stop! Stop! (R&B Version)

Vocals 
Anna Sedokova
Nadezhda Granovskaya
Vera Brezhneva

2004 albums
Nu Virgos albums